Tallmadge High School is a public high school in Tallmadge, Ohio, United States.  It is the only high school in the Tallmadge City School District.  THS was established in 1879 and the current facility opened in 2008.  The school colors are blue and gold and the athletic teams are known as the Blue Devils.  Tallmadge is one of seven schools that compete athletically in the American Division of the Suburban League.

The high school is part of the Six District Educational Compact, a joint program of six area school districts (Cuyahoga Falls, Hudson, Kent, Stow-Munroe Falls, Tallmadge, and Woodridge) to share access to each of their vocational training facilities and career resources.

State championships

 Baseball – 2002, 2017 
 Softball – 1981, 1987, 1988, 1989, 1993, 1997, 1998

External links

 District Website

Notes and references

High schools in Summit County, Ohio
Public high schools in Ohio